Ryntih Football Club, also known as Ryntih Sports Club (previously Ryntih Sports & Culture Club),
is an Indian professional football club based in Mawlai Mawdatbaki, Shillong, Meghalaya. Founded in 1998, the club competes in the Shillong Premier League. They have also participated in 2021 I-League Qualifiers.

History
Ryntih FC was founded in 1998 with the name Ryntih Sports & Culture Club in Mawlai Mawdatbaki, Shillong, in the Indian state of Meghalaya.
The Seng Samla Mawlai Mawdatbaki, a non-profitable youth social welfare organization separated the Ryntih Sports Club in 1990, with the motive to encourage and support less fortunate players with the opportunity to compete at a distinguished level. The objective  was to emphasize on the promotion of sporting activities.

The Ryntih Sports Club completed its registration to the Registration of Societies under the Society Registration Act in the year 1998.

In June 2020 they submitted bid documents for the direct entry in I-League, but could not enter.

In July 2020 Ryntih SC signed MoU with Bhutanese club Transport United FC.

Meghalaya Football Association recommended Ryntih FC for I-League Second Division.

Kit manufacturers and shirt sponsors

Stadium

Ryntih FC plays their home matches on Jawaharlal Nehru Stadium, Shillong.

Ownership
Ryntih FC is owned by Mawlai Mawdatbaki Fraternity.

Personnel

Players

First-team squad

Rivalry 
Ryntih FC has state rivalry with Shillong Lajong F.C.,
Rangdajied United FC and Langsning SC.

Honours

Cups
 All India Chief Ministers Gold Cup
Champions (1): 2020

Affiliated clubs
The following club is currently affiliated with Ryntih FC:
  Transport United FC (2020–present)

See also
List of football clubs in Meghalaya

References

External links

Ryntih FC at Global Sports Archive
Ryntih FC at Soccerway

Football clubs in Meghalaya
I-League 2nd Division clubs
Sports clubs established in 1998